is a Japanese idol singer, actress and tarento who has appeared in a number of television series, variety shows, videos, and magazines.

She was born in Nakatsu, Ōita. She is represented with the agency Prism.

Filmography

TV dramas

Variety programmes

Radio programmes

Films

Videography

Videos

DVD

Discography

Singles

Albums

Bibliography

References

External links
 – Ameba Blog 
 – Affiliation office
 

Japanese gravure idols
People from Nakatsu, Ōita
Musicians from Ōita Prefecture
1971 births
Living people
21st-century Japanese women singers
21st-century Japanese singers